Aleksandr Pavlovich Aleksandrov (born February 20, 1943) is a former Soviet cosmonaut and twice Hero of the Soviet Union (November 23, 1983, and December 29, 1987).

Biography 
Born in Moscow, Russia, he graduated from Moscow Bauman-Highschool in 1969 with a doctorate degree, specialised on spacecraft steering systems.

He was selected as cosmonaut on December 1, 1978. For his first spaceflight, he flew as Flight Engineer on Soyuz T-9, which lasted from June to November 1983. For his second spaceflight, he replaced one of the long-duration crew members of Mir EO-2. For the spaceflight, he was launched with the spacecraft Soyuz TM-3 in July 1987, and landed with the same spacecraft in December 1987. All together he spent 309 days, 18 hours, 2 minutes in space. He served as backup for Soyuz T-8, Soyuz T-13, and Soyuz T-15.

He resigned from the cosmonaut team on October 26, 1993, when he became chief of NPOE Cosmonaut-group; since 1996 he is Chief flight test directorate of RKKE. He is married with two children.

Honours and awards
Twice Hero of the Soviet Union
Pilot-Cosmonaut of the USSR
Two Orders of Lenin
Medal "For Merit in Space Exploration" (Russian Federation)

References

1943 births
Living people
Cosmonauts from Moscow
Soviet cosmonauts
Heroes of the Soviet Union
Recipients of the Medal "For Merit in Space Exploration"
Salyut program cosmonauts
Spacewalkers
Mir crew members
Laureates of the State Prize of Ukraine in Science and Technology